Ancylometis mulaella is a species of moth in the family Oecophoridae. It is endemic to Réunion in the Indian Ocean.

See also
 Picture of Ancylometis mulaella
 List of moths of Réunion

References

Moths described in 2011
Oecophoridae
Moths of Réunion
Endemic fauna of Réunion